The Indian Institute of Toxicology Research (previously the Industrial Toxicology Research Centre) is a laboratory run under the aegis of Council of Scientific and Industrial Research. It was established in 1965 by Sibte Hasan Zaidi and has its main campus in Lucknow with a satellite campus at Gheru.

References

External links
 
 List of CSIR Laboratories
 CSIR homepage

Toxicology organizations
Environmental organisations based in India
Research institutes in Lucknow
Council of Scientific and Industrial Research
Environmental research institutes
Research institutes established in 1965
1965 establishments in Uttar Pradesh